Alam Lohar was a prominent Pakistani Punjabi folk music singer. He is credited with creating and popularising the musical term Jugni.

Early life and career
Alam Lohar was born in 1928 in Achh, near Kotla Arab Ali Khan, Gujrat Tehsil, Gujrat District of Punjab, British India. He was born into a family of blacksmiths. As a child, Lohar read Sufiana Kalaam, a collection of Punjabi stories and poetry and started singing from a childhood age. His family and children now live all around the world with most of his children in the UK.

Alam Lohar modified a new style of singing the Punjabi Vaar, an epic or folk tale which made him popular when he toured villages and towns in the Punjab region. He is famous for his rendition of Waris Shah's Heer along with other songs such as Saif ul Maluk. He recorded his first album at the age of 13 and throughout his career he accomplished 15 Gold Disc LP's (record sales) for the following with mainly EMI/HMV Pakistan and other regional companies within Pakistan: Jugni (1965), Saif ul Mulook (1948), Qissa Yusuf Zulaykha (1961), Bol Mitti de Bawa (1964), Dilwala Dukhra (1975). In the memory when he met with an accident and received an injury at leg and call for help to people but no one came to help, he created a lyrics.... Wajan Mariyan Bulaya (1977), Qissa Mirza Sahiban (1967), Qissa Hirni (1963), Maa Da Pyaar (1971), Heer (1969), Qissa Sassi Pannu (1972), Qissa Baraa Maa (1974), Jis Din Mera Vayaah (1973), Qissa Dhulla Bhatti (1959), Mirza De Maa (1968)  .

In his childhood he used to read Sufi poetry (sufiana kalaam), Punjabi folk stories and participate as a young child in local gatherings expressing a vocal only art form in reading passages of great poets. From many of the gatherings out of the rural background, rose a great singer that could influence his audience with elements of joy, peace, happiness and sadness. Then he started going to festivals and gatherings on a regular basis and with these performances, he rose to become one of the most listened to singers in South Asia during the 1970s.

In the 1970s, Alam Lohar started to tour different countries including United Kingdom, Canada, Norway, United States and Germany to entertain the South Asian communities living in those countries.

Death
Alam Lohar died in an accident near Sham ki Bhattian on 3 July 1979 when a heavily loaded truck collided with his vehicle because the truck failed to overtake his car. He was buried at the outskirts of Lalamusa on GT Road in Pakistan. After his death, the President of Pakistan Muhammad Zia-ul-Haq honoured Alam Lohar with Pakistan's highest civil award for arts and theatre the Pride of Performance Award in 1979.

Legacy
Alam Lohar's death was unexpected, many singers in Pakistan and India including Lal Chand Yamla Jatt, Noor Jehan, Nusrat Fateh Ali Khan expressed sadness on the passing of Alam Lohar in a television broadcast on the 10th anniversary of Alam's death. One of Alam Lohar's sons namely Arif Lohar followed the tradition of his father and is also regarded as a famous folk singer in Pakistan. Throughout the period of the 1950s and until his death in 1979, he had dominated folk singing in Pakistan and was a major singer in Punjabi and Sufi singing worldwide. In many rural villages the local traditional people have called him 'Sher-e-Punjab' (Lion of Punjab) or 'Heerah' meaning diamond.

Some of Alam Lohar's songs have achieved critical acclaim and have contributed to the music and culture of the Punjab, most notably Jugni, Bol Mitti De Baweya, Mirza Sahiban (he was the main Punjabi singer to bring this story into a song format singing in a very distinct style – Jhori (double flute) & Chimta with a high pitch vocal) Wajan Mariyan Bulaya, Saif-ul-mulook, Dil Wala Dukhra and Shahbaz Qualander (Dhamaal). Alam Lohar is regarded as one of Pakistan's iconic performers who still remains popular in the region.

In memory of Alam Lohar the Government of Pakistan has named a road after him which runs from his birth village Aach to the main Grand Truck Road which is known as 'Alam Lohar Road'.

In memory of Alam Lohar, there is a visual theatre depiction of him performing which is on display at the Lok Virsa Museum in Islamabad.

References

External links

Alam Lohar Profile – Folk Punjab website
Alam Lohar's performance on YouTube

1928 births
1979 deaths
Punjabi people
People from Kharian
Pakistani folk singers
Punjabi-language singers
Recipients of the Pride of Performance
Pakistani playback singers
20th-century Pakistani male singers